HMCS Moresby was an  that served in the Canadian Forces from 1989 to 2000. She was named for Moresby Island, which in turn is named for Fairfax Moresby, former Commander-in-Chief of Pacific Station at Esquimalt Royal Navy Dockyard. Prior to her acquisition by Canada, Moresby served as the offshore supply vessel Joyce Tide, built by Allied Shipbuilders of Vancouver, British Columbia. Joyce Tide was acquired by the Canadian Forces for conversion to a minesweeper and as a training ship for naval reservists. With the entry into service of the s, Moresby was sold to commercial interests, returning to her previous career. The ship was renamed several times, most recently Ramco Express in 2007.

Design
The ship was initially constructed for use as an offshore drill-rig supply vessel by International Offshore Services. The Anticosti class was powered by four NOHAB Polar SF 16RS diesel engines driving two shafts creating  and one  Gil Jet azimuth bow thruster. The vessels were rated as ice class 3 and suitable for employment in light ice.

The vessel was purchased in 1988 by Maritime Command (MARCOM) of the Canadian Forces and converted into a minesweeping auxiliary. In military use the vessels had a complement of 5 officers and 18 ratings. The two ships of the class were equipped two Racal Decca navigation radars operating on the I band. For minesweeping purposes, they were provided with mechanical minesweeping equipment and a high frequency, towed side scan variable depth sonar.

Service history

The ship was laid down as Lady Joyce by Allied Shipbuilders Ltd. of Vancouver with the yard number 180 and launched on 11 November 1972. The ship was completed on 24 April 1973 and was renamed Joyce Tide in 1974.

As part of the plan for the Naval Reserve to take over minesweeping and coastal operations, MARCOM began its effort to provide ships for training. MARCOM acquired two ships, one being Joyce Tide in March 1988. The ship was converted at Marystown, Newfoundland to an minesweeping auxiliary and commissioned with the classification MSA 112. The mechanical sweeps, sonar and navigation systems were added in April 1990. In March 1997, the ship transferred to CFB Esquimalt.

Sold in 2000 for commercial use, her name was changed to Echo Star 2000 to 2002. In 2002 the vessel became Malbun, and later that year, her name was changed back to Echo Star. This name lasted until 2004 when her named was changed again to Silver Star. In 2005 the vessel's name was changed back to Echo Star, then back again to Silver Star, a name she kept until 2007. In 2007, the vessel was renamed Ramco 1 and then again to Ramco Express.

Moresby is now a commercial tug in Panama.

References

Citations

Sources

External links
 

Auxiliary ships of the Royal Canadian Navy
Anticosti-class minesweepers
1973 ships
Ships built in British Columbia